Peter F. Wolf (born August 25, 1952) is an Austrian composer, producer, songwriter and arranger. In 2002, he was awarded the Austrian Cross of Honour for Science and Art, 1st class (Österreichische Ehrenkreuz für Wissenschaft und Kunst). Wolf is married to fashion model and songwriter Lea Wolf-Millesi.

Career
Wolf studied classical piano at the Conservatory of Music in Vienna. At the age of 16, he won the European Jazz Festival as a solo pianist. Twice he won the Deutscher Schallplattenpreis, a German award, for his work with André Heller and Erika Pluhar.

Wolf moved to America in his early twenties. He worked with bassist Neal Starkey and guitarist Bill Hatcher in Atlanta, Georgia, and with drummer Steve Sample Jr. and keyboardist, guitarist, and vocalist Ray Reach in Birmingham, Alabama. After his time in the southeastern United States, Wolf moved to Los Angeles, where he played keyboards for Frank Zappa in the late 1970s. In 1987, he joined Terry Bozzio, Mark Isham, Peter Maunu, and Patrick O'Hearn in the band Group 87. 

Wolf began producing in 1985, co-producing the Commodores' "Nightshift". The following year, Wolf produced four hit singles: Starship's "We Built This City" and "Sara", Wang Chung's "Everybody Have Fun Tonight", and El Debarge's "Who's Johnny", leading to more studio and production work.

After losing his home and home studio in the 1994 Northridge earthquake, Wolf relocated to Austria and founded a new studio, Little America. 

Wolf composed music for the films Neverending Story III, Weekend at Bernie's II, The Hollywood Sign, and Nutcracker and Mouse King, which won an Oscar for Best Foreign Film. His credits include Father's Day, Die Cellistin (The Cellist), Widows, The Fearless Four and Band on the Run. In 2011, he composed music for the Christmas movie Als der Weihnachtsmann vom Himmel fiel.

In July 2015, Wolf and Lea Wolf-Millesi started Whamslam, an online entertainment platform for kids that combines creativity, music, and education.

Awards
In 2008, Wolf was honored with a BAMA Award (Birmingham Area Music Award) for his contributions to the Birmingham music scene.

Discography
 A Change in My Life/"Kraft durch Freude" (1969)
 Tutti/"Tutti" (1980)
 Progression – A Symphony by Peter Wolf (2000)
 The Other Side (2003)
 Sense-ation – A Symphony by Peter Wolf (2004)

with Gipsy Love
 Gipsy Love (The White Album) (1970)
 Here We Come (1972)

with Frank Zappa
 Sheik Yerbouti (1979) (Single "Bobby Brown", Peter Wolf on Keyboards, Butter, Flora Margarine)
 Joe's Garage Act 1 (1979)
 Joe's Garage Act 2 & 3 (April–June 1979)
 Tinsel Town Rebellion (May 11, 1981)
 Shut Up 'n' Play Yer Guitar (May 1984)

with Red Rider
 "Lunatic Fringe"/As Far as Siam (1981)

with Wolf & Wolf
 Culture Shocked/"Think Pink" (1982)
 Don't Take the Candy (1984)

with Grace Slick
 Software (1984)

with Vienna
 Guess What? (1987)

with Chicago
 Chicago XXXII: Stone of Sisyphus (1994/2008)

Arrangement and accompaniment
 Jefferson Starship - Nuclear Furniture / "No Way Out" (1984)
 Survivor - Vital Signs (1984)
 The Commodores - "Nightshift" (1985)
 Starship - "We Built This City" (1985)
 Maurice White - Maurice White (1985) (keyboards)
 Heart -  "What About Love" (1985) (synth, piano & creative input)
 Starship - "Sara" (1986) 
 Wang Chung - "Everybody Have Fun Tonight" (1986) (also performed drums)
 Heart - "These Dreams" (1986) 
 El DeBarge - "Who's Johnny" (main theme of the film Short Circuit) (1986)
 Patti LaBelle - "On My Own" (1986)
 Chris Sutton - Chris Sutton (1986)  
 Kenny Loggins - "Playing with the Boys" (from the films Top Gun and Side Out) (1986)
 Wang Chung - "Let's Go!" (1987) (also performed drums)
 Big Country - Peace in Our Time (Big Country album) (1988)
 Kenny Loggins - Back to Avalon (1988)
 Nik Kershaw - The Works (Nik Kershaw album) (1989)
 Lou Gramm - Long Hard Look (1989) (producer, keyboards)
 Go West - "King of Wishful Thinking" (from the film Pretty Woman) (1990)
 Laura Branigan - Laura Branigan (1990) (producer, keyboards, keyboard bass, percussion, arrangements)
 Bryan Duncan - Anonymous Confessions of A Lunatic Friend (1990) (keyboards)
 The Escape Club - "I'll Be There" (1991)
 Starship - "Good Heart" (1991)
 Indecent Obsession - "Kiss Me" (1992)
 The Pointer Sisters - "Only Sisters Can Do That" (1993) (Producer)
 Go West - "Faithful" (1992) No. 14 US, No. 13 UK
 4Him - "Love Finds You", "Between You And Me", "Wings" from Ride of Life (1994) (producer, keyboards, bass, piano, percussion, arrangements)
 Bryan Duncan - "Traces of Heaven, "Your Love, My Saving Grace", "Things Are Gonna Change" from Slow Revival (1994) (keyboards & track arrangements)
 Bryan Duncan - Mercy (1992) (keyboards & track arrangements)
 4Him ("Sacred Hideaway" from The Message, 1996) (producer, keyboards, arrangements)
 Cliff Richard - "Can't Keep this Feeling In" and album Real As I Wanna Be (1998) (Producer)
 Chicago - Chicago XXXII: Stone of Sisyphus (2008) (producer, arrangements, keyboards, keyboard bass)
 Scorpions - Eye II Eye (1999) (producer, piano, keyboards)

References

External links

whamslam.com

1952 births
20th-century Austrian musicians
20th-century Austrian male musicians
21st-century Austrian musicians
Austrian expatriates in the United States
Austrian male composers
Austrian pianists
Austrian record producers
Living people
Musicians from Vienna
Jefferson Starship members
People from Malibu, California
Recipients of the Austrian Cross of Honour for Science and Art, 1st class
Male pianists
21st-century pianists
21st-century male musicians